A Friend of Cupid is a 1925 silent-era British comedy film directed by Leslie S. Hiscott and featuring Sydney Fairbrother and Irene Tripod.

Cast
Sydney Fairbrother as Mrs. May
Irene Tripod as Mrs. McMull

References

External links
 

1925 films
1926 comedy films
1926 films
British comedy films
British silent short films
Films directed by Leslie S. Hiscott
British black-and-white films
1925 comedy films
1920s British films
Silent comedy films